André Lambert (born 1876, dead in September 1901, 8 ) was a French football player who competed in the 1900 Olympic Games. In Paris he won a silver medal as a member of Club Français club team.

References

External links

1876 births
French footballers
Olympic silver medalists for France
Olympic footballers of France
Footballers at the 1900 Summer Olympics
Year of death missing
Olympic medalists in football
Medalists at the 1900 Summer Olympics
Association football forwards
Date of birth missing
Place of birth missing
Place of death missing